Adrian Bălan (born 14 March 1990) is a Romanian professional footballer who plays as a forward for Liga I club Universitatea Cluj.

Club career

Voluntari
In February 2014, Bălan moved to second league club Voluntari, and eventually helped them gain promotion to the first league. In the 2015–16 season, Bălan made his Liga I debut while playing for them.

Politehnica Iași
On 27 June 2019, Bălan moved to Liga I club Politehnica Iași, after agreeing to sign a one-year contract with them.

Hermannstadt
On 15 January 2020, Bălan signed a contract with Romanian club Hermannstadt.

Honours

Team
Voluntari
Liga II: 2014–15
Liga III: 2013–14
Cupa României: 2016–17
Supercupa României: 2017

References

External links
 
 Adrian Bălan at Statisticsfootball.com

1990 births
Living people
Footballers from Bucharest
Romanian footballers
Association football forwards
Liga I players
Liga II players
Liga III players
FC Dinamo București II players
CS Sportul Snagov players
FC Voluntari players
FC Politehnica Iași (2010) players
FC Hermannstadt players
FC Rapid București players
FC Universitatea Cluj players